Triumph Sports Palace is an indoor arena that is located in Lyubertsy, Russia. The arena is primarily used to host basketball games. The seating capacity of the arena for basketball games is 4,000.

History
Triumph Sports Palace was used as the home arena of the Russian professional basketball team, Triumph Lyubertsy (now known as Zenit Saint Petersburg), when the club was based in Lyubertsy, Russia.

References

External links
 Triumph Sports Palace at bgbasket.com
 Triumph Sports Palace at bubabasket.com
 Image 1 of the Arena's Interior
 Image 2 of the Arena's Interior

Triumph
Triumph
Triumph
Buildings and structures in Moscow Oblast